The Samsung Galaxy S Duos 2 is a dual SIM Android smartphone, produced, released and marketed by Samsung Electronics, which serves as an immediate successor to the original Galaxy S Duos. It is the dual SIM version of the Samsung Galaxy Trend Plus.

Unveiled on 30 November 2013 at some Asian markets, it was initially released on December 5, 2013 in several countries. In contrast with other Dual SIM Samsung models, this phone is a part of the high-end "S" series. The external and physical design of the model is identical to the original model, placing emphasis on internal upgrades such as upgraded processor and updated operating system software.

Specifications

Hardware and design
The design of the S Duos 2 is the same as that of the S Duos. It features a rounded, polycarbonate chassis, faux metal trim and a removable rear cover, typical of most Samsung smartphones since the Galaxy S III. The S Duos 2 is available in Black, and White frost color finishes. The S Duos 2's screen is a 4.0-inch (102 mm) 233p TFT LCD panel, which is the same as that of the S Duos.

Camera 
The Galaxy S Duos 2 has a 5-megapixel  camera with LED flash and 0.3-megapixel front-facing camera. The rear camera has 7 shooting modes. This rear camera can record video in 720p, 480p and 240p.

Unlike entry-level dual SIM models from Samsung, the S Duos 2 is active on both SIMs all the time so it is ready to receive calls on either SIM when a call is not already in progress. Optionally it can receive two calls simultaneously, but this requires divert-on-not-reachable to be set up on each number and is subject to availability from the carrier and may incur additional charges. A limitation of the phone is that only one SIM can be active on UMTS (and therefore data) at a time and so it may be unsuitable for certain combinations of networks.

The S Duos 2 also contains a 1500 mAh removable battery. It lasts somewhere in 4–5 hours in heavy usage and just over 3 hours in gaming.

Software
The S Duos 2 ships with Android 4.2.2 "Jelly Bean" and Samsung's TouchWiz software. The S Duos 2 adds some of the Galaxy S4's features such as the widgets which were upgraded to the Samsung proprietary widgets used by models bearing the version of the OS.

Current support is brought unofficially through custom ROMs.

See also 
 Comparison of Samsung Galaxy S smartphones
 Comparison of smartphones
 Samsung Galaxy
 Samsung Galaxy S series

References 

Android (operating system) devices
Samsung mobile phones
Samsung Galaxy
Mobile phones introduced in 2013